Great Budworth is a civil parish in Cheshire West and Chester, England.  The parish contains 59 buildings that are recorded in the National Heritage List for England as designated listed buildings.  Other than the village of Great Budworth, the parish is entirely rural. Most of the listed buildings are houses, or buildings relating to farming, a high proportion of which are located within the village itself.  The village is described by Norman Bilsborough as being "probably one of the best-known villages in Cheshire", and Claire Hartwell et al. writing about the village in the Buildings of England series state "the immediate surroundings of the church make one of the best pieces of villagescape in the county".  The village is located in what was part of the estate of Arley Hall.  Between the 1860s and the end of the 19th century the owner of the hall, Rowland Egerton-Warburton, commissioned the restoration of existing buildings in the village and the construction of new ones.  To this end he employed architects working in the Vernacular Revival style, including John Douglas, Edmund Kirby, and William Eden Nesfield.  Douglas' biographer Edward Hubbard states that Egerton-Warburton had a "campaign to restore the village and render it picturesque in Victorian eyes".  Almost all the buildings in the centre of the village, those in Main Street, Church Street, and School Lane, are listed.

Of the 59 listed buildings, two are listed at Grade I, the highest grade, with one at Grade II*, the middle grade. The church in the centre of the village, St Mary and All Saints, is listed at Grade I.  It originated in the 14th century and was virtually complete by the end of the 16th century, although it underwent a series of restorations in the 19th century. It is described by Hartwell et al. as being "one of the most satisfactory Perpendicular churches of Cheshire". This was designed by James Gibbs in about 1750, and incorporates Palladian features, although the design was altered during the construction of the house, probably by the executant architect. Its most notable feature is the fine rococo plasterwork in the interior. The house is included in Simon Jenkins' England's Thousand Best Houses. The Grade II* listed building is the Old School House, built in 1615 as a school, and later converted into a reading room, then into a meeting room. Of the Grade II listed buildings, many of them are houses and farm buildings constructed in the 17th century. These are basically timber-framed buildings, some incorporating crucks, but most have since been recased, wholly or partly, in brick. Of the other structures, two are public houses: the Cock Inn, and the George and Dragon Inn. More unusual structures that have been listed are the churchyard walls, the sundial in the churchyard, the stocks standing outside the churchyard walls, the lychgate at the entrance to the churchyard, the guidepost standing on the A559 road, two wellhouses, and the telephone kiosk in High Street.

Key

Buildings

See also
Listed buildings in Anderton with Marbury
Listed buildings in Antrobus
Listed buildings in Aston by Budworth
Listed buildings in Comberbach
Listed buildings in Marston

References
Citations

Sources

Listed buildings in Cheshire West and Chester
Lists of listed buildings in Cheshire